Clivina brunnipennis is a species of ground beetle in the family Carabidae, found in Central and North America.

References

brunnipennis
Beetles described in 1846